Once a Gangster ( is a 2010 Hong Kong crime comedy film directed by Felix Chong.

Cast
 Ekin Cheng as Sparrow
 Jordan Chan as Roast Pork
 Alex Fong as Kerosene
 Michelle Ye as Nancy
 Candice Yu as Lady Pearl
 Wilfred Lau as Yan
 Conroy Chan as Scissor

Release
The film was released in Hong Kong on 20 May 2010.

References

External links
 
 
 
 Once a Gangster at the Hong Kong Cinemagic

2010s crime comedy films
Hong Kong crime comedy films
Triad films
2010s Cantonese-language films
2010 films
Films directed by Felix Chong
Media Asia films
Films set in Hong Kong
Films shot in Hong Kong
Hong Kong gangster films
2010 comedy films
2010s Hong Kong films